Hughes House may refer to:

 Martin Hughes House, Council Bluffs, Iowa
 David and M. Maria Hughes House, Williamsburg, Iowa
 Elzey Hughes House, Falmouth, Kentucky
 Hughes House (Keene, Kentucky)
 Daniel H. Hughes House, Morganfield, Kentucky
 Hughes House (Walton, Kentucky)
 Hughes House (Benton, Louisiana)
 Hughes House (Elk Rapids, Michigan)
 Hughes-Clark House, Fayette, Mississippi
 William Hughes House, Pascagoula, Mississippi
 Mollie and Josephine Hughes House, Independence, Missouri
 Langston Hughes House, New York, New York
 J. G. Hughes House, Columbus, North Carolina
 Hughes Manor, Middletown, Ohio
 George Hughes House, Stroud, Oklahoma
 Dr. Herbert H. Hughes House, Gresham, Oregon
 Patrick Hughes House, Sixes, Oregon
 Hughes House (Jefferson, Pennsylvania)
 Thomas H. Hughes House, Johnston, Rhode Island
 W.J. Hughes Business House, Cleveland, Tennessee
 Wood-Hughes House, Brenham, Texas
 Hughes House (Houston, Texas), former childhood home of Howard Hughes, today part of the University of St. Thomas campus
 Mason-Hughes House, San Angelo, Texas
 Charles Evans Hughes House, Washington, D.C.
 Hughes-Cunningham House, Hedgesville, West Virginia